Howard Charles Hickman (February 9, 1880 – December 31, 1949) was an American actor, director and writer. He was an accomplished stage leading man, who entered films through the auspices of producer Thomas H. Ince.

Career
In 1900, Hickman debuted on stage as an extra in a production in San Francisco. He went on to act in stock theater with the Alacazar, Morosco, and Melborne MacDowell companies, among others. On Broadway, Hickman wrote, and portrayed Gabby in, The Skirt (1921).

Hickman's initial work in films was with the Lasky Pictures Company, after which he acted with the Triangle Company and later the Ince company. 

In 1918, Hickman debuted as a director, with The Rainbow (for Paralta studios) as his first film. He directed 19 films.

With the rise of the sound film, Hickman returned to the film business but received mostly small roles, often as an authoritarian figure. Hickman made a brief appearance as plantation owner John Wilkes, father of Ashley Wilkes, in Gone with the Wind (1939). He ended his film career in 1944, after more than 270 films.

Personal life and death 
Hickman was married to actress Bessie Barriscale. He died of myocardial infarction in San Anselmo, California, and is buried at the Mount Tamalpais Cemetery, San Rafael, California.

Selected filmography

As actor

The Circus Man (1914) as Artful Dick Cronk
The Cup of Life (1915) as Higsby
The Man from Oregon (1915) as 'Honest' Jim Martin
Civilization (1915) as Count Ferdinand
The Moral Fabric (1916) as Mackley Stuart
The Wolf Woman (1916) as John Morton
The Jungle Child (1916) as Ridgeway Webb
Somewhere in France (1916) as Lt. Charles Ravignac
The Honorable Algy (1916) as Lord Rockmore
The Sin Ye Do (1916) as Robert Darrow
The Female of the Species (1916) as Carleton Condon
Chicken Casey (1917) as 'Dickey' Cochran
 Blood Will Tell (1917) as James Black
 The Snarl (1917) as Jack Mason
 Wooden Shoes (1917) as Jack Smith
Those Who Pay (1917) as George W. Graham
Madam Who? (1918) as Henry Morgan
The Cast-Off (1918) as Dr. Jim Thorpe
Blue Blood (1918) as Spencer Wellington
Rose o' Paradise (1918) as Lafe Grandoken
Social Ambition (1918) as Vincent Manton
Maid o' the Storm (1918) as Jules Picardo
Alias Jimmy Valentine (1928) as Mr. Lane
The Broadway Hoofer (1929) as Larry
 His First Command (1929) as Maj. Hall
Hello Sister (1930) as John Stanley
Brothers (1930) as John Naughton
The Age of Consent (1932) as Doctor (uncredited)
Tess of the Storm Country (1932) as Minister (uncredited)
The Silk Express (1933) as Mill Owner in Association (uncredited)
The Man Who Dared (1933) as Politician (uncredited)
I Loved a Woman (1933) as Businessman at Meeting (uncredited)
Walls of Gold (1933) as Bridge Player (uncredited)
The Right to Romance (1933) as Dr. Macey (uncredited)
The World Changes (1933) as Doctor (uncredited)
Hello, Sister! (1933)
The Big Shakedown (1934) as Board Member (uncredited)
Hi Nellie! (1934) as Dr. John W. Wilson (uncredited)
Gambling Lady (1934) as Divorce Judge (uncredited)
Jimmy the Gent (1934) as Doctor (uncredited)
Mystery Liner (1934) as Dr. Howard
George White's Scandals (1934) as Doctor (uncredited)
Three on a Honeymoon (1934) as Mr. Foster (uncredited)
A Modern Hero (1934) as Dr. McPherson (uncredited)
Sisters Under the Skin (1934) as Dutton
Upper World (1934) as Judge (uncredited)
Twentieth Century (1934) as Dr. Johnson (uncredited)
The Personality Kid (1934) as Joan's Doctor (uncredited)
Baby, Take a Bow (1934) as Blair (uncredited)
Return of the Terror (1934) as Judge
Side Streets (1934) as Dr. Randolph W. Hendricks (uncredited)
The Defense Rests (1934) as Judge (uncredited)
Here Comes the Navy (1934) as Captain
The Man with Two Faces (1934) as Mr. Jones (uncredited)
Death on the Diamond (1934) as Dr. Cushman (uncredited)
A Lost Lady (1934) as Dr. Barlow (uncredited)
Evelyn Prentice (1934) as Mr. Whitlock - Party Guest (uncredited)
Gentlemen Are Born (1934) as College President (uncredited)
The Silver Streak (1934) as Member Board of Directors (uncredited)
Fugitive Lady (1934) as Doctor (uncredited)
The Secret Bride (1934) as Senate President (uncredited)
The Mighty Barnum (1934) as Minor Role (scenes deleted)
Red Hot Tires (1935) as Judge Alcott
Carnival (1935) as Doctor (uncredited)
Law Beyond the Range (1935) as Captain Wood (uncredited)
Death Flies East (1935) as Carlyle (uncredited)
Captain Hurricane (1935) as Jimmy's Father (uncredited)
I'll Love You Always (1935) as Dean (uncredited)
Straight from the Heart (1935) as Police Sergeant (uncredited)
West Point of the Air (1935) as Army Officer in Former Times (uncredited)
Great God Gold (1935) as Dunbar - Marcia's Attorney (uncredited)
Fighting Shadows (1935) as Inspector Rutledge (uncredited)
Dinky (1935) as Judge Barlow (uncredited)
Let 'Em Have It (1935) as Assistant Chief Clerk (uncredited)
The Flame Within (1935) as Man at Hospital Benefit (uncredited)
Ginger (1935) as Juvenile Judge (uncredited)
The Murder Man (1935) as Howard Jennings (uncredited)
Bright Lights (1935) as Mr. Aldridge (uncredited)
Woman Wanted (1935) as Dr. Griffith (uncredited)
Little Big Shot (1935) as The Judge (uncredited)
I Live My Life (1935) as Teacher at Terry's Lecture (uncredited)
It's in the Air (1935) as Mr. Ruby
Three Kids and a Queen (1935) as Dr. Bowers (uncredited)
Rendezvous (1935) as G-Man
Whipsaw (1935) as Hotel Clerk (uncredited)
Too Tough to Kill (1935) as Billings (uncredited)
Two Against the World (1936) as Dr. Maguire
Hell-Ship Morgan (1936) as Cabot
Dangerous Waters (1936) as Ship Doctor (uncredited)
The Bohemian Girl (1936) as Dignified Captain (uncredited)
August Week End (1936) as Spencer
Too Many Parents (1936) as Colonel Colman
The Law in Her Hands (1936) as Judge Henry D. Morse (uncredited)
Fury (1936) as Governor
Parole! (1936) as Lawyer (uncredited)
Trapped by Television (1936) as G.P. Tucker - Board Member (uncredited)
To Mary - with Love (1936) as Guest #7
Swing Time (1936) as First Minister (uncredited)
Murder with Pictures (1936) as Judge (uncredited)
Libeled Lady (1936) as Cable Editor (uncredited)
15 Maiden Lane (1936) as Mr. Whitman - Jeweller (uncredited)
Wild Brian Kent (1936) as Bob Cruikshank
Love Letters of a Star (1936) as Dr. Webster
Pennies from Heaven (1936) as Chaplain (uncredited)
Crack-Up (1936) as Major White
Happy Go Lucky (1936) as Dr. Wilson
Career Woman (1936) as Judge Whitman
We Who Are About to Die (1937) as Prison Chaplain
Join the Marines (1937) as Pruitt
Outcast (1937) as Dr. Matthews (uncredited)
The Great Barrier (1937) as Donald Smith - Member of C.P.R. Board
The Crime Nobody Saw (1937) as Robert Mallory
Maytime (1937) as Opera Director (uncredited)
Jim Hanvey, Detective (1937) as Herbert Frost
Motor Madness (1937) as Dr. Cadman (uncredited)
Criminals of the Air (1937) as Harrison (uncredited)
Venus Makes Trouble (1937) as Howard Clark
Charlie Chan at the Olympics (1937) as Dr. Burton
Married Before Breakfast (1937) as Arthur - Man Bringing in Two Hoboes (uncredited)
Roaring Timber (1937) as Banker (uncredited)
The Lady Escapes (1937) as Judge
Artists and Models (1937) as Mr. Currie (uncredited)
One Mile from Heaven (1937) as Judge Clarke
Western Gold (1937) as Jim Thatcher
The Man Who Cried Wolf (1937) as Doctor on Stage (uncredited)
One Hundred Men and a Girl (1937) as Johnson
Back in Circulation (1937) as Judge (uncredited)
Roll Along, Cowboy (1937) as Dr. Cooper (uncredited)
Murder in Greenwich Village (1937) as Mr. Sloan (uncredited)
Checkers (1937) as Race Judge (uncredited)
Borrowing Trouble (1937) as Judge Walters
Tarzan's Revenge (1938) as Mr. Johnson (uncredited)
Love Is a Headache (1938) as Editor Williams (uncredited)
My Old Kentucky Home (1938) (uncredited)
Start Cheering (1938) as Dr. Fosdick
King of the Newsboys (1938) as Judge (uncredited)
Flight into Nowhere (1938) as Howard Hammond
Rascals (1938) as Judge
Numbered Woman (1938)
Holiday (1938) as Churchgoer (uncredited)
The Rage of Paris (1938) as Man in Opera Box (uncredited)
Woman Against Woman (1938) as Mr. Jamison (uncredited)
Panamint's Bad Man (1938) as Marshal Winston (uncredited)
Smashing the Rackets (1938) as James J. Carew (uncredited)
Come On, Leathernecks! (1938) as Captain Felton
Juvenile Court (1938) as Governor Stanley
Young Dr. Kildare (1938) as Dr. Harris (uncredited)
I Stand Accused (1938) as Gilbert
Next Time I Marry (1938) as Judge Jonathan Travers (uncredited)
Kentucky (1938) as Banker (uncredited)
Convict's Code (1939) as Prison Warden
Off the Record (1939) as Doctor (uncredited)
Wings of the Navy (1939) as Capt. Dreen (uncredited)
Wife, Husband and Friend (1939) as Concert Manager
Three Smart Girls Grow Up (1939) as Conference Room Businessman (uncredited)
Everybody's Baby (1939) as Dr. Jenkins
Trouble in Sundown (1939) as John Cameron
The Kid from Texas (1939) as Doctor at Polo Grounds (uncredited)
Good Girls Go to Paris (1939) as Jeffers - Brand's Butler
On Borrowed Time (1939) as Chief Surgeon (uncredited)
When Tomorrow Comes (1939) as Wealthy Man (uncredited)
The Under-Pup (1939) as Business Man (uncredited)
The Angels Wash Their Faces (1939) as Judge Wilson (uncredited)
Full Confession (1939) as Third Doctor (uncredited)
Thunder Afloat (1939) as Surgeon (uncredited)
Espionage Agent (1939) as Walter Forbes
The Kansas Terrors (1939) as Governor-General del Montez
 Beware Spooks! (1939) as Judge Roth (uncredited)
Little Accident (1939) as Mr. Allerton
The Return of Doctor X (1939) as Chairman (scenes deleted)
Gone with the Wind (1939) as John Wilkes
Slightly Honorable (1939) as Sen. Sam Scott
My Son Is Guilty (1939) as Commissioner George Dodge (uncredited)
The Man from Dakota (1940) as Confederate Colonel (uncredited)
Castle on the Hudson (1940) as The Judge (uncredited)
Virginia City (1940) as Confederate Gen. Page (uncredited)
Dark Command (1940) as Southerner Orating for Votes (uncredited)
It All Came True (1940) as Mr. Prendergast
Bullet Code (1940) as John Mathews
Gangs of Chicago (1940) as Judge Whitaker
Island of Doomed Men (1940) as Judge (uncredited)
Girls of the Road (1940) as Gov. Warren
They Drive by Night (1940) as The Judge (uncredited)
The Secret Seven (1940) as Dr. Talbot
Boom Town (1940) as McCreery's Associate #1 (uncredited)
Yesterday's Heroes (1940) as Trustee (uncredited)
Spring Parade (1940) as Colonel (uncredited)
Strike Up the Band (1940) as Doctor
Little Men (1940) as Doctor (uncredited)
Bowery Boy (1940) as Dr. Axel Winters
Four Mothers (1941) as Music Foundation Director (uncredited)
Maisie Was a Lady (1941) as Dr. Stephen W. Fredericks (uncredited)
Cheers for Miss Bishop (1941) as Professor Lancaster
Robin Hood of the Pecos (1941) as Colonel Davis (uncredited)
Back Street (1941) as Mr. Williams (uncredited)
Golden Hoofs (1941) as Calvin Harmon
Robbers of the Range (1941) as Roy Tremaine
Washington Melodrama (1941) as Bishop Chatterton
Lady from Louisiana (1941) as Judge William Harding (uncredited)
Scattergood Pulls the Strings (1941) as Withers
Angels with Broken Wings (1941) (uncredited)
Blossoms in the Dust (1941) as Texas Senator (uncredited)
Hurricane Smith (1941) as Sen. Bradley
Hold That Ghost (1941) as Judge (uncredited)
Dive Bomber (1941) as Admiral (uncredited)
Ice-Capades (1941) as Lawyer (uncredited)
Belle Starr (1941) as Colonel Thornton
Nine Lives Are Not Enough (1941) as Colonel Andrews
Doctors Don't Tell (1941) as Dr. Watkins
You Belong to Me (1941) as Mr. Deker (uncredited)
Tuxedo Junction (1941) as Judge Leo Rivers
Paris Calling (1941) as French General (uncredited)
Dick Tracy vs. Crime Inc. (1941) as Stephen Chandler
Uncle Joe (1941) as Banker Jones
Lady for a Night (1942) as Civil War General (uncredited)
The Vanishing Virginian (1942) as Dr. Edwards (uncredited)
Born to Sing (1942) as Critic (uncredited)
The Male Animal (1942) as Faculty Member (uncredited)
True to the Army (1942) as Brigadier General (uncredited)
I Was Framed (1942) as Stuart Gaines
Kid Glove Killer (1942) as Clemence - First Politician (uncredited)
Tarzan's New York Adventure (1942) as Blake Norton
Bells of Capistrano (1942) as Doctor (uncredited)
Tish (1942) as Mr. Fielding Kelbridge (uncredited)
Andy Hardy's Double Life (1942) as Lincoln Lumber's Attorney (uncredited)
Three Hearts for Julia (1943) as Mr. Doran (uncredited)
The Masked Marvel (1943) as Warren Hamilton
Watch on the Rhine (1943) as Cyrus Penfield (uncredited)
Captain America (1944, Serial) as Lyman's Attorney [Ch. 4] (uncredited)
Casanova in Burlesque (1944) as Dean Wyatt (uncredited)
The Heavenly Body (1944) as Scientist (uncredited)
Her Primitive Man (1944) as Bilson (uncredited)
Follow the Boys (1944) as Dr. Wood (uncredited)
Gypsy Wildcat (1944) (uncredited)
National Barn Dance (1944) as Mr. Hollander (uncredited)
The Last Ride (1944) as Mr. Bronson (uncredited)
Mrs. Parkington (1944) as Dr. Herrick (uncredited)
Bowery to Broadway (1944) as Showman (uncredited) (final film role)

As director

His Mother's Portrait (1915)
When Love Leads (1915)
The White Lie (1918)
The Heart of Rachael (1918)
Two-Gun Betty (1918)
All of a Sudden Norma (1919)
A Trick of Fate (1919)
Hearts Asleep (1919)
Josselyn's Wife (1919)
Tangled Threads (1919)
Her Purchase Price (1919)
 Kitty Kelly, M.D. (1919)
Beckoning Roads (1919)
 Just a Wife (1920)
 The Killer (1921)
Nobody's Kid (1921)
 The Lure of Egypt (1921)
 A Certain Rich Man (1921)
Man of the Forest (1921)

As writer
 Kitty Kelly, M.D. (1919)
Nobody's Kid (1921)

References

External links 

 
 
 

1880 births
1949 deaths
American male film actors
American male silent film actors
American male stage actors
American film directors
American male screenwriters
20th-century American male actors
20th-century American male writers
20th-century American screenwriters